This is a list of computer software which is made for bioinformatics and released under open-source software licenses with articles in Wikipedia.

See also 
 List of sequence alignment software
 List of open-source healthcare software
 List of biomedical cybernetics software
 List of freeware health software
 List of genetic engineering software
 List of molecular graphics systems
 List of systems biology modelling software
 Comparison of software for molecular mechanics modeling
 List of proprietary bioinformatics software

References

External links 
 Free Biology Software – Free Software Directory – Free Software Foundation

Lists of bioinformatics software

Bioinformatics
Open